A suicide mission is a task which is so dangerous for the people involved that they are not expected to survive. The term is sometimes extended to include suicide attacks such as kamikaze and suicide bombings, whose perpetrators actively commit suicide during execution of the mission.

Distinctions
The risks involved with suicide missions are not always apparent to those participating in them or to those who plan them. However, for an action to be considered a suicide mission someone involved must be aware of the risks; therefore, a mission that goes wrong is not a suicide mission. Rather, in some instances, an individual or group taking part in a mission may perceive the risks involved to be far greater than what they believe to be acceptable, while those planning or commanding the mission may think otherwise; these situations can lead to refusals to participate in missions on the basis that they are "suicide missions". Conversely, planners or commanders may be well aware of the risks involved with missions while those participating in them may not.

Military and wartime
In a military context, soldiers can be ordered to perform very dangerous tasks or can undertake them on their initiative. For example, in the First World War, French soldiers mutinied en masse in 1917, after appalling losses convinced them that their participation at the front would inevitably lead to their deaths,, and in October 2004, during the Iraq War, 17 soldiers in the US Army refused orders to drive unarmored fuel trucks near Baghdad, calling the task a "suicide mission". Those soldiers faced investigations for breakdown of discipline. 

At the same time, many individuals or groups voluntarily undertake suicide missions in times of war. For example, both the Waffen SS and the Imperial Japanese Army were known for executing what could be labeled as suicide missions throughout the Second World War.

Suicide missions can also be an act of desperation, such as a last stand, or to save lives. The latter end of the Battle of Stalingrad could be seen as a suicide mission from the German perspective, as they were ordered to fight to the death with no option of surrendering nor the chance of escape.

Special forces
Special forces units are often sent on missions that are exceedingly dangerous with the hope that their superior training and abilities will allow them to complete them successfully and survive. An example is a desperate attempt by two U.S. Delta Force snipers to protect a downed helicopter pilot (Michael Durant) from being killed or captured by masses of Somali militia during the Battle of Mogadishu in 1993. While the sniper team held off overwhelming numbers of Somalis long enough for the pilot to survive, both snipers were killed, and the pilot was eventually captured but then later released.

However, even special forces groups refuse to participate in some missions. Operation Mikado, a plan for a Special Air Service raid on Río Grande, Tierra del Fuego, during the 1982 Falklands War, was ultimately not executed due in part to significant hostility from members of the SAS, who saw the mission as exceedingly risky.

Armed hostage takings
Armed hostage takings, particularly those planned (e.g., by a terrorist group) for political purposes, could be considered suicide missions. As most governments have a policy of refusing to negotiate with terrorists, such incidents usually end with a bloody confrontation between the hostage-takers and an armed force (e.g., police or military) attempting to free the hostages. Also, such hostage-takings often occur in a country foreign to the perpetrators, thereby limiting their chances of escape. Notable examples include the 1972 Munich massacre, the 1977 Landshut hijacking, the 1980 Iranian Embassy siege, the 1996 Japanese embassy hostage crisis, and the 2004 Beslan school hostage crisis. All of these high-profile hostage-takings ended with the hostage-takers being engaged by the military forces of the country in which the incident occurred, with the vast majority of the hostage-takers being killed in the aftermath. The extent to which the hostage-takers in each incident expected to survive or simply desired to capitalize on their publicity to send a message is a matter of speculation.

See also
Forlorn hope
Green Light Teams
Seppuku, also known as Harakiri
Kaiten
 Kamikaze
 Suicide Squad - a fictional espionage group in DC Comics who are sent on suicide missions

References

Military operations by type
Mission